Hoehnephytum is a genus of Brazilian flowering plants in the sunflower family.

 Species
 Hoehnephytum almasense D.J.N.Hind - Bahia
 Hoehnephytum imbricatum (Gardner) Cabrera - Minas Gerais, Bahia
 Hoehnephytum trixoides (Gardner) Cabrera - Minas Gerais, São Paulo, Goiás, Distrito Federal

References

Asteraceae genera
Endemic flora of Brazil
Senecioneae
Taxa named by Ángel Lulio Cabrera